Prince Yu of the First Rank (hošoi erke cin wang), or simply Prince Yu, was the title of a princely peerage used in China during the Manchu-led Qing dynasty (1644–1912). It was also one of the 12 "iron-cap" princely peerages in the Qing dynasty, which meant that the title could be passed down without being downgraded.

The first bearer of the title was Dodo (1614–1649), the 15th son of Nurhaci, the founder of the Qing dynasty. He was awarded the title in 1636 by his half-brother, Huangtaiji, who succeeded their father as the ruler of the Qing Empire. The peerage was renamed to Prince Xin of the First Rank (Prince Xin) when Dodo's son, Duoni (1636–1661), inherited his father's title in 1649. In 1652, the Shunzhi Emperor downgraded the peerage to Prince Xin of the Second Rank. In 1778, the Qianlong Emperor restored the peerage as "Prince Yu of the First Rank". The title was passed down over ten generations and was held by 14 people: nine as Prince Yu, and five as Prince Xin.

Members of the Prince Yu / Prince Xin peerage

 Dodo (1st), Nurhaci's 15th son, held the title Prince Yu of the First Rank from 1636 to 1649, posthumously honoured as Prince Yu Tong of the First Rank (豫通親王)
 Duoni (多尼; 1636 – 1661) (2nd), Dodo's second son, held the title Prince Yu of the First Rank from 1649 to 1651 before it was renamed to Prince Xin of the First Rank and downgraded to Prince Xin of the Second Rank in 1652, posthumously honoured as Prince Yu Xuanhe of the First Rank (豫宣和親王)
 Ezha (鄂扎; d. 1702) (3rd), Duoni's second son, held the title Prince Xin of the Second Rank from 1661 to 1702, posthumously honoured as Prince Yu of the First Rank
 Dezhao (德昭; d. 1762) (5th), Ezha's fifth son, held the title Prince Xin of the Second Rank from 1706 to 1762, posthumously honoured as Prince Yuque of the First Rank (豫慤親王)
 Xiuling (修齡; 1749 – 1786) (7th), Dezhao's 15th son, held the title Prince Yu of the First Rank from 1778 to 1786, posthumously honoured as Prince Yu Liang of the First Rank (豫良親王)
 Yufeng (裕豐; 1769 – 1833) (8th), Houling's second son, held the title Prince Yu of the First Rank from 1786 to 1814, stripped of his title in 1814
 Yuxing (裕興; 1772 – 1829), Houling's third son, held the title Prince Yu of the First Rank from 1814 to 1820, stripped of his title in 1820
 Yuquan (裕全; d. 1840), Houling's fifth son, held the title Prince Yu of the First Rank from 1820 to 1840, posthumously honoured as Prince Yu Hou of the First Rank (豫厚親王)
 Yidao (義道; 1819 – 1868), Yuquan's son, held the title Prince Yu of the First Rank from 1841 to 1868, posthumously honoured as Prince Yu Shen of the First Rank (豫慎親王)
 Benge (本格; 1846 – 1898), Yidao's son, held the title Prince Yu of the First Rank from 1868 to 1898, posthumously honoured as Prince Yu Cheng of the First Rank (豫誠親王)
 Xingling (興齡; 1726 – 1775), Dezhao's son
 Mingxiang'a (明祥阿; 1770 – 1814), Xingling's son
 Enrui (恩瑞; 1797 – 1850), Mingxiang'a's son
 Shengzhao (盛照; b. 1847), Enrui's son
 Maolin (懋林; 1892 – 1913), Shengzhao's son, adopted as Benge's son, held the title Prince Yu of the First Rank from 1899 to 1913
 Duanzhen (端鎮; 1909 – 1962), Maolin's son, held the title Prince Yu of the First Rank from 1913 to 1945
 Dorbo (多爾博; 1643 – 1673), Dodo's fifth son
 Su'erfa (蘇爾發; d. 1708), Duo'erbo's second son
 Saile (塞勒; d. 1729), Su'erfa's eldest son
 Gongyibu (功宜布; d. 1746), Saile's fifth son
 Rusong (如松; d. 1770) (6th), Gongyibu's son, held the title Prince Xin of the Second Rank from 1762 to 1770, posthumously honoured as Prince Yuke of the First Rank (豫恪親王)
 Dongge (董額; 1647 – 1706) (4th), Dodo's seventh son, held the title Prince Xin of the Second Rank from 1703 to 1706

Family tree

|-
|Legend:
|-
|

See also
 Royal and noble ranks of the Qing dynasty

References
 

Qing dynasty princely peerages
Peerages of the Plain Blue Banner